Grand Cape Mount-3 is an electoral district for the elections to the House of Representatives of Liberia. The constituency covers Tewor District, four communities of the Robertsport Commonwealth District (Weima, Tallah General, Kpallan and Kebba) as well as the Dazanbo community of Porkpa District.

Elected representatives

References

Electoral districts in Liberia